Sam Anas (born June 1, 1993) is an American professional ice hockey forward. He currently plays for the Hershey Bears of the American Hockey League (AHL). While growing up in Potomac, Maryland, he attended Landon School. Later, he attended Quinnipiac University. He became the second player that played in the Montgomery Youth Hockey Association (MYHA) to sign an NHL contract when he agreed to terms with the Minnesota Wild.

Playing career
Anas played for the NCAA Division I Quinnipiac Bobcats men's ice hockey team in the ECAC Hockey conference. In his freshman year, Anas's outstanding play was rewarded when he was selected as 2014 ECAC Hockey Rookie of the Year and named to both the 2013–14 ECAC Hockey All-Rookie Team and the All-ECAC Hockey Second Team. Anas was further honored when he was chosen as the 2014 College Hockey News Rookie of the Year. As a sophomore, he landed a spot on the AHCA/CCM Hockey All-American Second Team.

He received AHCA/CCM Hockey Men's Division I All-America First Team honors following his junior year (2015–16), while making the ECAC Hockey First Team, the All-CollegeHockeyNews.com Second Team and the NCAA Tournament All-Regional Team.

On April 15, 2016, Anas signed a two-year, two-way contract with the Minnesota Wild. This made him the first player born in the Washington, D.C., area who played hockey locally through high school and then signed with an NHL team.

Anas won the American Hockey League's scoring title in 2019–20, but unable to crack the NHL with the Minnesota Wild during his highly successful tenure in the AHL with Iowa, Anas left as a free agent. On October 10, 2020, Anas agreed to a two-year, two-way contract with the St. Louis Blues.

Following his stint in the Blues organization, Anas left as a free agent and signed a one-year AHL contract with the Hershey Bears on August 15, 2022.

Personal life
Anas is of Greek descent, the son of Peter and Demetra Anas. While at Quinnipiac University, Anas majored in business. His mother Demetra died from breast cancer in August 2020.

Career statistics

Awards and honors

References

External links 

1993 births
AHCA Division I men's ice hockey All-Americans
American men's ice hockey forwards
American people of Greek descent
Hershey Bears players
Ice hockey people from Maryland
Iowa Wild players
Living people
People from Potomac, Maryland
Quinnipiac Bobcats men's ice hockey players
Springfield Thunderbirds players
Utica Comets players
Youngstown Phantoms players